Namtvedt is a Norwegian surname. Notable people with the surname include:

Bo André Namtvedt (born 1967), Norwegian racing cyclist
Leidulv Namtvedt (born 1950), Norwegian diplomat
Olav Steinar Namtvedt (born 1947), Norwegian politician

Norwegian-language surnames